Sanicula canadensis, the Canadian blacksnakeroot, is a native plant of North America and a member of family  Apiaceae. It is biennial or perennial, and spreads primarily by seed. It grows from 1 to 4.5 feet tall, and is found in mesic deciduous woodlands. The whitish-green flowers with sepals longer than petals, appearing late spring or early summer and lasting for approximately three weeks, are green and bur-like. The bur-like fruit each split into 2 seeds. The species ranges throughout the eastern United States (excluding Maine), extending north into Quebec and Ontario, and west into Texas and Wyoming.

References

External links

canadensis
Flora of Eastern Canada
Flora of the North-Central United States
Flora of the Northeastern United States
Flora of the Southeastern United States
Flora of the Appalachian Mountains
Flora of the Great Lakes region (North America)
Flora of the Great Plains (North America)
Flora of the United States
Plants described in 1753
Taxa named by Carl Linnaeus
Flora without expected TNC conservation status